Edward Robb (March 19, 1857 – March 13, 1934) was a U.S. Representative from Missouri.

Born in Brazeau, Missouri, Robb attended the common schools, Brazeau (Missouri) Academy, Fruitland (Missouri) Normal Institute, and the University of Missouri in Columbia.
He was graduated from the law department of the University of Missouri in March 1879.
He was admitted to the bar in 1879 and commenced practice in Perryville.

Robb was elected prosecuting attorney of Perry County in 1880 and reelected in 1882.
He served as member of the State house of representatives in 1884–1886.
He served as assistant attorney general of the State in 1889–1893.

Robb was elected as a Democrat to the Fifty-fifth and to the three succeeding Congresses (March 4, 1897 – March 3, 1905).
He was an unsuccessful candidate for reelection in 1904 to the Fifty-ninth Congress.
He served as delegate to the Democratic National Convention in 1908.
He resumed the practice of law until his death in Perryville, Missouri, March 13, 1934.
He was interred in Home Cemetery.

References

1857 births
1934 deaths
University of Missouri alumni
Democratic Party members of the Missouri House of Representatives
Democratic Party members of the United States House of Representatives from Missouri